This is a list of single- and double-action revolvers, listed alphabetically by manufacturer.

See also
List of firearms
List of multiple-barrel firearms
List of submachine guns
List of assault rifles
List of machine guns
List of pistols
List of semi-automatic pistols
List of shotguns
List of sniper rifles

References

Revolvers
List